Justine Sowry (born 3 October 1970 in Whyalla, South Australia) is an Australian former field hockey goalkeeper and current Head Coach of University of Louisville Women's Field Hockey, the Cardinals, which competes in the Atlantic Coast Conference (ACC) in the United States. She was a member of Australia women's national field hockey team from 1991 - 2001 which is best known as the Hockeyroos which won the World Cup in 1994 and 1998. She was capped 128 times during her international career. She was a member of the Hockeyroos Olympic Squad for the Atlanta (1996) and Sydney Olympics (2000).

Coaching career
Sowry earned a bachelor's degree in Physical Education and Mathematics from the University of South Australia, the program influenced by esteemed coach and teacher educators Alan Launder and Wendy Piltz. Sowry began her US coaching career at the University of Louisville, where she spent five years (1998-2002) as an assistant coach to Pam Bustin. Sowry served as a USA High Performance Coach with the U.S. Field Hockey Association (USFHA) from 2003–07 and was the director of all goalkeeping programs. Sowry spent a year as an assistant coach for the Stanford University field hockey program in 2003, and went on to become assistant coach of the United States Junior National Team in 2005 and the  Senior National team in 2006.

In 2007 Sowry was appointed Head Coach of UMass field hockey and led the program to national prominence over four seasons in the role. Sowry had a 58-31 (.652) overall record in those four seasons, including a 22-4 (.846) mark in Atlantic 10 play, and was named A-10 Coach of the Year three of those four seasons (2007, 2008, 2010), and Dita/NFHCA Northeast Region Coach of the Year twice (2008, 2010).

In 2011 Sowry returned to the University of Louisville Cardinals' now as Head Coach and is currently in her third season at the helm of the women's field hockey team. In 2012 Cardinals posted a 12-8 overall record and made their eighth straight appearance in the BIG EAST semifinals. Three players earned all-conference honours while Amber Thomas was selected to the NFHCA All-Region team.

Coaching achievements
 2011 Dita/NFHCA Division I Northeast Region Coach of the Year
 2011 Atlantic 10 Coach of the Year
 2010 Dita/NFHCA Northeast Region Coach of the Year
 2010 Atlantic 10 Coach of the Year
 2008 Dita/NFHCA Northeast Region Coach of the Year
 2008 Atlantic 10 Coach of the Year
 2007 WomensFieldHockey.com Coach of the Year
 2007 Atlantic 10 Coach of the Year

References

1970 births
Living people
Australian female field hockey players
Female field hockey goalkeepers
Sportswomen from South Australia
Field hockey players from Adelaide
Commonwealth Games medallists in field hockey
Commonwealth Games gold medallists for Australia
Field hockey players at the 1998 Commonwealth Games
People from Whyalla
Australian expatriate sportspeople in the United States
Louisville Cardinals field hockey coaches
University of South Australia alumni
Australian field hockey coaches
UMass Minutewomen field hockey coaches
Medallists at the 1998 Commonwealth Games